Greenhill Creek Recreation Park is a protected area located in the Australian state of  South Australia about  east of the Adelaide city centre in the suburb of Greenhill.  

The land forming the recreation park which first received protected area status on 27 November 1952 as a national pleasure resort. The national pleasure resort was re-proclaimed under the National Parks and Wildlife Act 1972 as the Greenhill Recreation Park on 27 April 1972.

In 1980, it is described as having "a long history of grazing, clearing and bushfires", as having "vegetation consisting primarily of Eucalyptus odorata, E. leucoxylon and E obliqua open woodland over a largely introduced understorey of grasses, herbs and forbs" and its "principal value" is as "an excellent recreational lookout offering extensive views over Adelaide".

The recreation park is classified as an IUCN Category III protected area.  In 1980, it was listed on the former Register of the National Estate.

References

Recreation Parks of South Australia
Protected areas established in 1952
1952 establishments in Australia
South Australian places listed on the defunct Register of the National Estate